J. Lindsay Barn is a historic barn located near Newark, New Castle County, Delaware.  It was built around 1820, and is a large, bi-level stone building with fieldstone walls accented by round-arched doorways and windows.  It features large rectangular and square quoins and two gable cupolas atop the gable roof.  Also on the property is a 19th-century stone outbuilding.

It was added to the National Register of Historic Places in 1986.

References

Barns on the National Register of Historic Places in Delaware
Buildings and structures completed in 1820
Buildings and structures in New Castle County, Delaware
National Register of Historic Places in New Castle County, Delaware